The Elizabeth Arden Classic was a golf tournament on the LPGA Tour from 1969 to 1986. It was played at several different courses in the Miami, Florida area.

Tournament locations

Winners
Elizabeth Arden Classic
1986 Ayako Okamoto
1985 JoAnne Carner
1984 Patty Sheehan
1983 Nancy Lopez
1982 JoAnne Carner
1981 Sally Little
1980 Jane Blalock
1979 Amy Alcott

American Cancer Society Classic
1978 Debbie Austin
1977 Pam Higgins

Burdine's Invitational
1976 Judy Rankin
1975 Donna Caponi
1974 Sandra Palmer
1973 Jo Ann Prentice
1972 Marlene Hagge
1971 Sandra Haynie
1970 Carol Mann
1969 JoAnne Gunderson (as an amateur)

References

External links
Results at Golfobserver.com

Former LPGA Tour events
Golf in Florida
Sports competitions in Miami
Recurring sporting events established in 1969
Recurring events disestablished in 1986
1969 establishments in Florida
1986 disestablishments in Florida
Women's sports in Florida